Robert Leonard may refer to:

 Robert Sean Leonard (born 1969), American actor
 Robert Z. Leonard (1889–1968), American film director
 Robert A. Leonard, forensic linguist and original member of Sha Na Na
 Robert Leonard (curator) (born 1963), New Zealand art curator

See also
Bob Leonard (disambiguation)